Jacques Berthier (27 June 1923 – 27 June 1994) was a French composer of liturgical music, best known for writing much of the music used at Taizé.

Biography 
Berthier was born in Auxerre, Burgundy; both of his parents were musicians - his father Paul was the kapellmeister and organist at the Auxerre Cathedral. Learning first from his parents, Berthier was trained in music at the École César Franck in Paris. While there, he was taught by, among others, Edouard Souberbielle and Guy de Lioncourt (whose daughter he married).

In 1955 Berthier was first asked to compose music for the Taizé Community, which was then just a monastic community of twenty brothers. Six years later he became organist at the Church of the Jesuits in Paris, Saint-Ignace, where he worked until his death. In 1975, Berthier was again asked to compose for Taizé, this time for chants to be sung by the increasing numbers of young people coming to worship there. Over nearly twenty years, Berthier built up a body of church music that has been utilized around the world.

He died at his home in Paris in 1994, and requested that none of his own music be used in his funeral at Saint-Sulpice. In 2006, the Jubilate Deo Award was granted to him posthumously and accepted by Brother Jean-Marie (Taizé). His son is Vincent Berthier de Lioncourt.

Music

In more than twenty years, Berthier left an important corpus (232 songs in 20 different languages) in wide use today by other communities and around the world. He is also the author of Masses for organ, a cantata in the form of the cross and a cantata for Saint Cecilia.

Taizé songs
The current  edition of the song booklet used by the Taizé Community contains 71 songs written by Jacques Berthier.

External links 
Jacques Berthier at GIA Publications
The Taizé Composers 
Prayer and Song at Taizé
Alleluia CD with track samples. Live at St. Paul's Cathedral, London (1987)
Jubilate CD with track samples. Using twenty languages, this recording reflects what Taizé is today.
Wait for the Lord CD with track samples.  This is the first American recording of the music of Taizé.

1923 births
1994 deaths
People from Auxerre
Christian hymnwriters
French composers
French male composers
French classical organists
French male organists
French composers of sacred music
French hymnwriters
20th-century classical musicians
20th-century French musicians
Taizé Community
20th-century organists
20th-century French male musicians
Male classical organists